In the distribution and logistics of many types of products,  track and trace or tracking and tracing concerns a process of determining the current and past locations (and other information) of a unique item or property.

This concept can be supported by means of reckoning and reporting of the position of vehicles and containers with the property of concern, stored, for example, in a real-time database. This approach leaves the task to compose a coherent depiction of the subsequent status reports.

Another approach is to report the arrival or departure of the object and recording the identification of the object, the location where observed, the time, and the status. This approach leaves the task to verify the reports regarding consistency and completeness. An example of this method might be the package tracking provided by shippers, such as the United States Postal Service, Deutsche Post, Royal Mail, United Parcel Service, AirRoad, or FedEx.

Technology 

The international standards organization EPCglobal under GS1 has ratified the EPC network standards (esp. the EPC information services EPCIS standard) which codify the syntax and semantics for supply chain events and the secure method for selectively sharing supply chain events with trading partners. These standards for Tracking and Tracing have been used in successful deployments in many industries and there are now a wide range of products that are certified as being compatible with these standards.

In response to a growing number of recall incidents (food, pharmaceutical, toys, etc.), a wave of software, hardware, consulting and systems vendors have emerged over the last few years to offer a range of traceability solutions and tools for industry. Radio-frequency identification and barcodes are two common technology methods used to deliver traceability.

RFID is synonymous with track-and-trace solutions, and has a critical role to play in supply chains. RFID is a code-carrying technology, and can be used in place of a barcode to enable non-line of sight-reading. Deployment of RFID was earlier inhibited by cost limitations but the usage is now increasing.

Barcoding is a common and cost-effective method used to implement traceability at both the item and case-level. Variable data in a barcode or a numeric or alphanumeric code format can be applied to the packaging or label. The secure data can be used as a pointer to traceability information and can also correlate with production data such as time to market and product quality.

Packaging converters have a choice of three different classes of technology to print barcodes:
Inkjet (dot on demand or continuous) systems are capable of printing high resolution (300 dpi or higher for dot on demand) images at press speed (up to 1000fpm). These solutions can be deployed either on-press or off-line.
Laser marking can be employed to ablate a coating or to cause a color change in certain materials. The advantage of laser is fine detail and high speed for character printing, and no consumables. Not all substrates accept a laser mark, and certain colors (e.g. red) are not suitable for barcode reading.
Thermal transfer and direct thermal. For lower speed off-press applications, thermal transfer and direct thermal printers are ideal for printing variable data on labels.

Consumers can access web sites to trace the origins of their purchased products or to find the status of shipments. Consumers can type a code found on an item into a search box at the tracing website and view information. This can also be done via a smartphone taking a picture of a 2D barcode and thereby opening up a website that verifies the product (i.e. product authentication).

See also
Drug distribution
Mobile asset management
Real-time locating system
Tracking system

References

Navigation
Tracking
Wireless locating
Track and Trace
Food safety
Pharmaceutical industry
Product recalls
Supply chain management
Automatic identification and data capture